There are many ghost towns in West Virginia some of which were created and abandoned as part of the "boom and bust" economy of coal mining industry.

List

 Algoma, in McDowell County.
 Ames, in Fayette County.
 Bachman, in Fayette County.
 Bartley, in McDowell County.
 Beartown, in McDowell County.
 Beury, in Fayette County.
 Big Sandy, in McDowell County.
 Black Wolf, in McDowell County.
 Blue Sulphur Springs, in Greenbrier County.
 Boone, in Fayette County.
 Brink, in Greenbrier County.
 Brooklyn, in Fayette County.
 Brown, in Fayette County.
 Caperton, in Fayette County.
 Carbondale, in Fayette County.
 Carlisle, in Fayette County.
 Carver, in Fayette County.
 Cinderella, in Mingo County.
 Concho, in Fayette County.
 Crescent, in Fayette County.
 Cunard, in Fayette County.
 Derryhale, in Fayette County.
 Devon, in Mingo County.
 Dimmock, in Fayette County.
 Dunloup, in Fayette County.
 Eagle, in Fayette County.
 Elverton, in Fayette County.
 Emmett, in Logan County.
 Ennis, in McDowell County.
 Erskine, in Fayette County.
 Faraday, in McDowell County.
 Fayette, in Fayette County.
 Fire Creek, in Fayette County.
 Freed, in Calhoun County.
 Gad, in Nicholas County, submerged under Summersville Lake.
 Gamoca, in Fayette County.
 Gaymont, in Fayette County.
 Gilliam, in McDowell County.
 Glade, in Fayette County.
 Glen Alum, in Mingo County.
 Goodwill, in Mercer County.
 Harewood, in Fayette County.
 Hawks Nest, in Fayette County.
 Honeydew, in Fayette County.
 Ingram Branch, in Fayette County.
 Jacobs Fork, in McDowell County.
 Jerryville, in Webster County. 
 Kay Moor, in Fayette County.
 Kilsyth, in Fayette County.
 Kingston, in Fayette County.
 Krollitz, in McDowell County.
 Landgraff, in McDowell County.
 Landisburg, in Fayette County.
 Layland, in Fayette County.
 Lex, in McDowell County.
 Lobelia, in Pocahontas County. 
 Long Branch, in Fayette County.
 Lookout, in Fayette County.
 Lynn, in Mingo County. 
 McDunn, in Fayette County.
 Mahan, in Fayette County.
 Marting, in Fayette County.
 Meadow Fork, in Fayette County.
 Micajah, West Virginia, in Mercer County.
 Michigan, in Fayette County.
 Milburn, in Fayette County.
 Mohawk, in McDowell County.
 New Thacker, in Mingo County.
 Newlyn, in Fayette County.
 Nuttallburg, in Fayette County.
 Old Gauley, in Fayette County.
 Pando
 Panther, in McDowell County.
 Pearlytown
 Pennbrook, in Fayette County.
 Putney, in Kanawha County.
 Ream, in McDowell County.
 Red Ash, in Fayette County.
 Royal, in Raleigh County.
 Rush Run, in Fayette County.
 Rutherford, in Ritchie County.
 Sewell, in Fayette County.
 Stone House, in Taylor County.
 Stotesbury
 Sun
 Sunnyside
 Superior
 Thirty-One Camp
 Thurmond
 Turkey Knob
 Vanetta
 Virginius Island
 Volcano
 War Eagle
 Westerly
 Whitney
 Willis Branch
 Wilmore
 Wyndal
 Wyoming
 Yerba

Notes and references

 
West Virginia
Ghost towns
Ghost